Franz Schall (1 June 1918 – 10 April 1945) was a German military aviator who served in the Luftwaffe during World War II. As a fighter ace, he flew approximately 550 combat missions and claimed 137 aerial victories—that is, 137 aerial combat encounters resulting in the destruction of the enemy aircraft. He was also a recipient of the Knight's Cross of the Iron Cross, the highest award in the military and paramilitary forces of Nazi Germany during World War II.

He was killed on 10 April 1945,  when his aircraft rolled into a bomb crater and exploded during an attempted emergency landing at Parchim.

Career
Schall was born on 1 June 1918 in Graz in Austria-Hungary. He began his military service with the anti-aircraft artillery before in September 1941 he was trained as a fighter pilot. Holding the rank of Leutnant (second lieutenant), Schall was posted to the 3. Staffel (3rd squadron) of Jagdgeschwader 52 (JG 52—52nd Fighter Wing) on 18 February 1943. At the time, this Staffel was commanded by Oberleutnant Rudolf Miethig and was part of I. Gruppe (1st group) of JG 52 headed by Hauptmann Helmut Bennemann.

War against the Soviet Union
World War II in Europe had begun on Friday 1 September 1939 when German forces invaded Poland. Germany had launched Operation Barbarossa, the invasion of the Soviet Union on 22 June 1941. In February 1943, I. Gruppe was based at Poltava on the Eastern Front and was subordinated to Luftwaffenkommando Don which supported the fighting in the Third Battle of Kharkov.

On 13 July during the Battle of Kursk, Schall, accompanied by his wingman Oberfeldwebel Franz Woidich, claimed an Ilyushin Il-2 ground attack aircraft shot down.

Schall was awarded the German Cross in Gold on 20 March 1944. On 10 June 1944, I. Gruppe was ordered to an airfield named Peloniczna near Lviv. Seven days later, they were moved to Serpneve. On 22 June, Soviet forces launched Operation Bagration, attacking Army Group Centre in Byelorussia, with the objective of encircling and destroying its main component armies. On 24 June, the Gruppe transferred to Galați and again to Peloniczna. The Gruppe reached Grabowiec in eastern Poland on 27 July and Kraków on 1 August. On 12 August they were again relocated and moved to Mzurowa.

Fighting across Poland, it led to his most prolific period in the war with a number of multiple victories in a day: three on 12 August (74-76), three more on the 24th (79-81). On 26 August, Schall became a "double ace-in-a-day" for the first time, claiming eleven aerial victories which included six Ilyushin Il-2 ground-attack aircraft. On 31 August, he surpassed this figure, claiming thirteen aerial victories, including his 100th claim, which took his total to 109 victories. He was the 81st Luftwaffe pilot to achieve the century mark. In September 1944, Schall left JG 52 and transferred to a jet fighter unit.

Flying the Messerschmitt Me 262
On 25 September 1944, Schall was posted to a specialist unit dubbed Kommando Nowotny, named after Walter Nowotny, for testing and establishing tactics for the newly developed Messerschmitt Me 262 jet fighter. General der Jagdflieger (General of the Fighter Force) Adolf Galland had hoped that the Me 262 would compensate for the United States Army Air Forces (USAAF) numerical superiority. There, following the death of Hauptmann Alfred Teumer on 4 October, Schall was appointed Staffelkapitän of 2. Staffel. On 7 October, Schall and Feldwebel Helmut Lennartz were scrambled at 13:45 from Hesepe airfield to intercept a heavy bomber formation. In this encounter, both Schall and Lennartz each claimed a USAAF Consolidated B-24 Liberator bomber shot down, the first aerial victories of Kommando Nowotny. Schall claimed a North American P-51 Mustang fighter destroyed on 28 October and a Republic P-47 Thunderbolt fighter on 6 November. He was awarded the Knight's Cross of the Iron Cross on 10 October 1944.

Generals Alfred Keller and Galland had scheduled an inspection of Kommando Nowotny for the afternoon of 7 November 1944. Galland had already visited Kommando Nowotny several times and was deeply concerned over the high attrition rate and meager success achieved by the Me 262. After inspecting the two airfields at Achmer and Hesepe, he stayed in the Penterknapp barracks discussing the problems of the past few weeks. Several pilots openly expressed their doubts as to the readiness of the Me 262 for combat operations. When the Generals arrived again at Nowotny's command post the next morning a large bomber formation was reported. Two Rotten of Me 262 were prepared for take-off, Erich Büttner and Schall at Hesepe, and Nowotny and Günther Wegmann at Achmer. At first only Schall and Wegmann managed to take off because Büttner had a punctured tire during taxiing and Nowotny's turbines initially refused to start. Schall and Wegmann both made contact with the Americans, claiming a P-51 and P-47 respectively. Schall shot down two P-51s before suffering engine failure. Attempting to glide his aircraft to Hesepe, Schall was shot down by Lieutenant James W. Kenney of the 357th Fighter Group. While Schall managed to bail out safely, Nowotny was killed in action.

Following Nowotny's death, the pilots of Kommando Nowotny were moved to Lechfeld were they were joined by 20–25 pilots from III. Gruppe of Ergänzungs-Jagdgeschwader 2, also known as Erprobungskommando Lechfeld, a replacement training unit which had also trained on the Me 262. On 19 November, Kommando Nowotny became the III. Gruppe of Jagdgeschwader 7 (JG 7 - 7th Fighter Wing), the world's first operational jet fighter wing, and was moved to Brandenburg-Briest. JG 7 had been formed in August 1944 and placed under the command of Oberst Johannes Steinhoff. At the time of its creation, III./JG 7 was commanded by Major Erich Hohagen and command of 10. Staffel was handed to Schall.

On 18 March 1945, the USAAF Eighth Air Force attacked Berlin with 1,329 bombers, escorted by 733 fighter aircraft. A number of Me 262s intercepted the bomber formation and its escorts in vicinity of Nauen-Rathenow-Brandenburg-Potsdam. At approximately 11:15, Schall claimed a P-51 shot down. The next day, 374 Boeing B-17 Flying Fortress bombers from the 3d Air Division attacked Carl Zeiss AG, a manufacturer of optical systems, in Jena, and the motor vehicle factories at Zwickau and Plauen. In defense of this attack, Schall claimed a B-17 shot down north of Chemnitz. On 21 March 1945, the USAAF Eighth Air Force attacked various Luftwaffe airfields in Germany with approximately 1,300 heavy bombers, escorted by 750 fighter aircraft. That day, Schall claimed another aerial victory over a P-51. The next, the Eighth Air Force again targeted various military installations and airfields in Germany. Yet again Schall claimed a P-51 shot down, that day in the Cottbus-Bautzen-Dresden area. On 24 March, 1,714 bombers, escorted by approximately 1,300 fighter aircraft, targeted 18 Luftwaffe airfields. Schall led 10. Staffel at about 12:00 from Parchim airfield and engaged the bombers south of Berlin. Approximately 15 Me 262s, the majority of them armed with R4M air-to-air rockets, claimed a number of bombers destroyed, including a B-17 by Schall. On 31 March 1945, the Royal Air Force (RAF) Bomber Command targeted Wilhelmshaven, Bremen and Hamburg. The attack force from No. 219, No. 429, No. 431, No. 434, No. 408, No. 415 and No. 425 Squadron had made their target approach by night. In morning hours, the British and Canadians were intercepted by 20 Me 262s from I. Gruppe and seven Me 262s from III. Gruppe who claimed 19 four-engined bombers, two fighters and probable destruction of another bomber. Schall claimed two victories in this engagement.

On 4 April, Schall claimed a P-51 shot down. That day, RAF Bomber Command had targeted Nordhausen with 243 Avro Lancaster bombers while the USAAF Eighth Air Force sent 950 B-17s and B-24s to Luftwaffe airfields at Kaltenkirchen, Parchim, Perleberg, Wesendorf, Faßberg, Hoya, Dedelstorf and Eggebek, as well as the U-boat yards at Finkenwerder and shipyards at Kiel. This bomber force was protected by 800 escort fighters. On 9 April, the RAF targeted the German ships ,  and  moored at Kiel and other targets in northern Germany. That afternoon, Schall claimed a Lancaster shot down. On 10 April 1945, Schall claimed a P-51 shot down. He was then killed when his aircraft rolled into a bomb crater, flipped, and exploded during an attempted emergency landing at Parchim Airfield. That day, the Luftwaffe lost a number of Me 262 pilots, including Oberleutnant Walther Wever. The Americans dubbed this day the "great jet massacre".

Summary of career

Aerial victory claims
According to US historian David T. Zabecki, Schall was credited with 133 aerial victories. Forsyth also lists Schall with 133 aerial victories claimed in 530 combat missions. This figure includes 17 claims flying the Me 262 jet fighter, including six four-engined heavy bombers and eleven P-51 fighters. Spick however lists him with 137 aerial victories claimed in approximately 550 combat missions. Mathews and Foreman, authors of Luftwaffe Aces — Biographies and Victory Claims, researched the German Federal Archives and found records for 133 aerial victory claims, plus four further unconfirmed claims. This figure of confirmed claims includes 117 aerial victories on the Eastern Front and 16 on the Western Front flying the Me 262 jet fighter, including five four-engined bombers.

Victory claims were logged to a map-reference (PQ = Planquadrat), for example "PQ 35 Ost 61184". These sectors were then subdivided into 36 smaller units to give a location area 3 × 4 km in size.

Awards
 Iron Cross (1939) 2nd and 1st class
 Honour Goblet of the Luftwaffe on 20 March 1944 as Leutnant and pilot
 German Cross in Gold on 20 March 1944 as Leutnant in the I./Jagdgeschwader 52
 Knight's Cross of the Iron Cross on 10 October 1944 as Leutnant and Staffelführer in the I./Jagdgeschwader 52

Notes

References

Citations

Bibliography

 
 
 
 
 
 
 
 
 
 
 
 
 
 
 
 
 
 
 
 
 

1918 births
1945 deaths
Luftwaffe pilots
German World War II flying aces
Luftwaffe personnel killed in World War II
Recipients of the Gold German Cross
Recipients of the Knight's Cross of the Iron Cross
Military personnel from Graz
Shot-down aviators